The Toba betta (Betta rubra) is a species of gourami endemic to Sumatra, Indonesia where it is an inhabitant of peat swamps. The species grows to a length of  TL, and it can also be found in the aquarium trade.

Parental care
Unlike Betta splendens which is a bubble nest builder, the Toba betta is a mouthbrooding fish.

References

Betta
Taxa named by Alberto Perugia
Fish described in 1893
Fish of Indonesia